The Queen Extravaganza Tour was a concert tour by official Queen tribute band the Queen Extravaganza.

Background
The Queen Extravaganza was Queen's official tribute band, developed by the band's original drummer, Roger Taylor. The original band members were selected from an online audition process.

It was announced on March 28, 2012, that Queen Extravaganza would tour North America visiting twenty-six cities in the United States and Canada.

On October 26, 2012, a second tour of North America was announced via Queenonline.com.

Setlist
{{hidden
| headercss = background: #ccccff; font-size: 100%; width: 50%;
| contentcss = text-align: left; font-size: 100%; width: 50%;
| header = 2012 Setlist
| content =
"We Will Rock You (Fast)"
"Tie Your Mother Down"
"Now I'm Here"
"Killer Queen"
"Love of My Life"
"I Want It All"
"Bicycle Race"
"I Want to Break Free"
"The March Of the Black Queen"
"Dragon Attack"
"You Take My Breath Away"
"Save Me"
"Crazy Little Thing Called Love"
"Lazing on a Sunday Afternoon"
"I'm in Love with My Car"
"Bohemian Rhapsody"
Intermission
"One Vision"
"A Kind of Magic"
"Don't Stop Me Now"
"Under Pressure"
"Who Wants to Live Forever"
"Another One Bites the Dust"
"You're My Best Friend"
"Seven Seas of Rhye"
"Drum solo"
"Stone Cold Crazy"
"In the Lap of the Gods"
"In the Lap of the Gods... Revisited"
"Radio Ga Ga"
"Fat Bottomed Girls"
"Somebody to Love"
Encore
"We Will Rock You"
"We Are the Champions"
}}
{{hidden
| headercss = background: #ccccff; font-size: 100%; width: 50%;
| contentcss = text-align: left; font-size: 100%; width: 50%;
| header = 2013 Setlist
| content =
"We Will Rock You (Fast)"
"Killer Queen"
"I Want to Break Free"
"Dragon Attack"
"Crazy Little Thing Called Love"
"Love of My Life"
"Don't Stop Me Now"
"Lazing on a Sunday Afternoon"
"I'm in Love with My Car"
"Bohemian Rhapsody"
"Under Pressure"
"A Kind of Magic"
"You're My Best Friend"
"Drum solo"
"Stone Cold Crazy"
"Another One Bites the Dust"
"The Show Must Go On
"Radio Ga Ga"
"Fat Bottomed Girls"
"Somebody to Love"
Encore
 ""Tie Your Mother Down""
"We Will Rock You"
"We Are the Champions"
}}
{{hidden
| headercss = background: #ccccff; font-size: 100%; width: 50%;
| contentcss = text-align: left; font-size: 100%; width: 50%;
| header = 2014 Setlist
| content =
"We Will Rock You (Fast)"
"Killer Queen"
"I Want to Break Free"
"Don't Stop Me Now"
"Love of My Life"
"Dragon Attack"
"Crazy Little Thing Called Love"
"Lazing on a Sunday Afternoon"
"I'm in Love with My Car"
"Bohemian Rhapsody"
"Under Pressure"
"A Kind of Magic"
"I Want It All"
"You're My Best Friend"
"Stone Cold Crazy"
"Another One Bites the Dust"
"The Show Must Go On"
"Radio Ga Ga"
"Fat Bottomed Girls"
"Somebody to Love"
Encore
 ""Tie Your Mother Down""
"We Will Rock You"
"We Are the Champions"
}}
{{hidden
| headercss = background: #ccccff; font-size: 100%; width: 50%;
| contentcss = text-align: left; font-size: 100%; width: 50%;
| header = A Night at the Opera 40th Anniversary Tour 2015
| content =
'''pre-A Night at the Opera:
"Now I'm Here"
"Keep Yourself Alive"
"The March of the Black Queen"
"Seven Seas of Rhye"
"In the Lap of the Gods"
"Killer Queen"
"Tenement Funster"
"Flick of the Wrist"
"Lily of the Valley"
"Stone Cold Crazy"
"Liar"
"In the Lap of the Gods... Revisited"
A Night at the Opera:
"Death on Two Legs (Dedicated to...)"
"Lazing on a Sunday Afternoon"
"I'm in Love with My Car"
"You're My Best Friend"
"'39"
"Sweet Lady" (feat. "drum solo")
"Seaside Rendezvous"
"The Prophet's Song"
"Love of My Life"
"Good Company"
"Bohemian Rhapsody"
"God Save the Queen"
Encore:
"Somebody to Love"
}}
{{hidden
| headercss = background: #ccccff; font-size: 100%; width: 50%;
| contentcss = text-align: left; font-size: 100%; width: 50%;
| header = A Night at the Opera 2016
| content =
A Night at the Opera:
"Death on Two Legs (Dedicated to...)"
"Lazing on a Sunday Afternoon"
"I'm in Love with My Car"
"You're My Best Friend"
"'39"
"Sweet Lady"
"Seaside Rendezvous"
"The Prophet's Song"
"Love of My Life"
"Good Company"
"Bohemian Rhapsody"
"God Save the Queen"
'''post-A Night at the Opera:
"Tie Your Mother Down"
"Seven Seas of Rhye"
"Don't Stop Me Now"
"Stone Cold Crazy"
"Another One Bites The Dust"
"Save me"
"I Was Born To Love You"
"Under Pressure "
"Fat Bottomed Girls"
"The Show Must Go On"
"Radio Ga Ga"
Somebody to Love"
Encore:
"We Will Rock You"
"We Are The Champions"
}}

Tour dates

Festivals and other miscellaneous performances
Two performances

Box office score data

Tour band

Current members
 Alirio Netto — lead vocals
 Nick Radcliffe — lead guitar, backing vocals
 Brian Gresh — lead guitar, backing vocals (2012-2013 & 2018 North American Tour) 
 Tyler Warren — drums, percussions, backing vocals
 François-Olivier Doyon — bass guitar, backing vocals
 Darren Reeves — keyboards, backing vocals 
 Alex Maynard — keyboards, backing vocals 

Former members
 Tristan Avakian — lead guitar, rhythm guitar, backing vocals (2012 tour only)
Yvan Pedneault — vocals, backing vocals (2012 tour only)
Jeff Scott Soto — vocals, backing vocals (2012 tour only)
 Jennifer Espinoza — vocals
 Brandon Ethridge — keyboards, piano, backing vocals
 Marc Martel — lead vocals, piano, rhythm guitar (not touring during 2018)

References

External links
QueenOnline – Official Queen Website
QueenExtravaganza – Official Queen Extravaganza Website

2012 concert tours
Queen (band)